Uuno Epsanjassa (an intentional misspelling of "Uuno in Spain") is a Finnish 1985 comedy film directed by Ere Kokkonen. It is the tenth film in the Uuno Turhapuro series. It was seen by more than 600,000 people in the theatres.

Plot

Uuno Turhapuro (played by Vesa-Matti Loiri) is searching for a job and takes a correspondence course in tour guiding. Eventually he gets a job in a small travel agency and takes a group of Finnish tourists to Marbella, Spain. Unfortunately Uuno's father-in-law Tuura (Tapio Hämäläinen) is in the group, too, with his wife (Marita Nordberg) and daughter, Uuno's wife Elisabet (Marjatta Raita). Tuura tries to get a signature to an important paper from a minister who's having a holiday in the area. Meanwhile, Uuno just relaxes and enjoys the sun.

Miscellaneous
"Epsanjassa" is humorous misspelling of the word "Espanjassa" (in Spain) that imitates uneducated spelling error.

External links
 

1985 films
Spede Pasanen
Finnish comedy films
Finnish sequel films
1980s Finnish-language films

Films shot in Spain